The Jones, later Prichard-Jones Baronetcy, of Bron Menai, Dwyran, in Llangeinwen in the County of Anglesey, is a title in the Baronetage of the United Kingdom. It was created on 15 July 1910 for John Jones, head of Dickins and Jones (Limited) and founder of the Prichard-Jones Institute and Cottage Homes, Newborough, Anglesey. In 1917 he assumed by deed poll the additional surname of Prichard.

Jones, later Prichard-Jones baronets, of Bron Menai (1910)
Sir John Prichard-Jones, 1st Baronet (1845–1917)
Sir John Prichard-Jones, 2nd Baronet (1913–2007)
Sir David John Walter Prichard-Jones, 3rd Baronet (born 1943). His heir is a cousin, cousin Richard Stephen Prichard-Jones (born 1952).

Notes

Baronetcies in the Baronetage of the United Kingdom
Dormant baronetcies